Orrin Dubbs Bleakley (May 5, 1854 – December 3, 1927) was an American businessman and politician who served as a Republican member of the U.S. House of Representatives from Pennsylvania for one month in 1917. He resigned his seat after a conviction for campaign finance improprieties.

Early life and career
Bleakley was born on May 5, 1854 in Franklin, Pennsylvania.  He attended the University of Bonn, in Prussia.  He was engaged in banking with his father until 1876.  He became interested in the production of oil and worked in the industry from 1876 to 1883.  He organized the Franklin Trust Company in 1883, and became its president.  He was a delegate at large to the Republican National Convention in 1904, and served as chairman of the Venango County Republican committee.

Upon his election to Congress in November 1916, Bleakley became the first government official to fly from his home state to DC. The trip was made in a 75-horsepower Curtiss biplane from Philadelphia, piloted by Sergeant William C. Ocker, on leave from the United States Aviation Corps at the time. The trip took 3:15 hours, including an unscheduled stop in a wheatfield in Maryland.

Congress and later career
Bleakley was elected as a Republican to the Sixty-fifth Congress and served from 4 March to 3 April 1917, when he resigned without having qualified. His resignation came after he was convicted and fined under the Federal Corrupt Practices Act. Bleakley's offense—he had spent more than the allotted $5,000 on his campaign.

He resumed banking in Franklin. He died in Robinson, Illinois on December 3, 1927.  Interment in Franklin Cemetery in Franklin, Pennsylvania.

Sources

The Political Graveyard
Venango County Historical Society. Venango County 2000: The Changing Scene. VCHS, Franklin. 2000.

References 

1854 births
1927 deaths
People from Franklin, Pennsylvania
University of Bonn alumni
Republican Party members of the United States House of Representatives from Pennsylvania